Jean-Michel Bayle (born 1 April 1969) is a French former professional motorcycle racer. He was one of the most successful riders of his era, achieving success at the highest levels in both motocross and road racing.

Biography
Born in Manosque, Alpes-de-Haute-Provence, Bayle won the FIM 125cc motocross world championship in 1988, and the 250cc motocross world championship a year later. He competed in the United States in 1991, becoming the only rider ever to win all three major AMA motocross championships in the same year (Supercross, 250cc and 500cc). Having won many of the major motocross championships, Bayle became one of the few riders to switch motorcycling disciplines, going from dirt track motocross events to pavement based road race events.

He competed in the 250cc road racing world championship for the Aprilia factory racing team during the 1994 Grand Prix motorcycle racing season, and in 1996 moved up to the 500cc class for the Kenny Roberts-Yamaha team. He scored points twice in 1999. He managed one pole position in the 250cc class and 2 poles in the 500cc division but, never managed to finish on the podium. In 2002, he teamed with Sébastien Gimbert and Nicolas Dussauge to win the Bol d'or and the 24 Hours of Le Mans endurance races. Bayle suffered serious injuries during the 2002 season and retired from road racing competition.

He still competes in motocross events and campaigned in the French observed trials national championship. Bayle was inducted into the AMA Motorcycle Hall of Fame in 2000.

Career statistics

Grand Prix motorcycle racing

Races by year
(key) (Races in bold indicate pole position) (Races in italics indicate fastest lap)

References

1969 births
Living people
People from Manosque
French motocross riders
250cc World Championship riders
500cc World Championship riders
AMA Motocross Championship National Champions
Sportspeople from Alpes-de-Haute-Provence
MotoGP World Championship riders